Dair Mar Elia, also known as Saint Elijah's Monastery, was a Christian monastery located just south of Mosul, in the Nineveh Governorate, Iraq. It was founded in the late 6th century and was one of the oldest monasteries in Iraq. It belonged to the Church of the East, an ancient branch of Eastern Christianity, and then to the Chaldean Catholic Church. The monastery closed in 1743, after its monks were massacred by Persian forces. Its ruins were damaged during the invasion of Iraq in 2003, and were later demolished by the Islamic State of Iraq and the Levant (ISIL) in 2014.

History
The monastery was founded around 595 AD by Mar Elia, a monk who had previously studied at al-Hirah and later in the great monastery at Izla mountain in modern Turkey. It belonged to the Church of the East. The monastery was the center of the regional Christian community and for centuries thousands of Christians would visit the monastery to observe the Mar Elia Holiday, which falls on the last Wednesday of November.

The main sanctuary of the monastery was built in the 11th century, and it was renovated by Hurmizd Alqushnaya in the 17th century. In 1743, the Persian leader Tahmaz Nadir Shah damaged the monastery and killed the 150 monks who lived there, after they refused to convert to Islam. The monastery lay in ruins until the beginning of the 20th century, when some restoration was completed on a few halls and rooms. During the First World War, Dair Mar Elia was a place of refuge which led to the rebuilding of part of the site. The structure, along with its neighboring reservoir and natural mineral water springs, were cared for by the Chaldean Catholic Church, and Christian pilgrims continued to visit the ruins. In the 1970s, the monastery became a base for the Iraqi Republican Guard.

Iraq War and destruction

During the 2003 invasion of Iraq, the monastery was damaged by Iraqi tank units, which trashed rooms and filled a cistern with garbage. One of its walls was destroyed after being hit by a T-72 tank turret. After the 101st Airborne Division took control of the area, the site lay within Forward Operating Base Marez. American soldiers vandalized the monastery by inscribing graffiti on the walls and by whitewashing the chapel, destroying its 600-year-old murals in the process. The structure was further damaged by looters. However, a military chaplain saw the importance of the site, and a commander ordered troops to vacate the monastery. Eventually, US military chaplains began taking care of the structure, and gave tours of the ruins to soldiers.

In May 2008, Iraqi archaeologists were able to visit the areas for the first time since the invasion. Later that year, the US military's efforts to restore Dair Mar Elia were reported in the international media. The journalist James Foley, who was later beheaded by ISIL, wrote that the site was being saved "for future generations of Iraqis who will hopefully soon have the security to appreciate it." Prior to the withdrawal of U.S. troops from Iraq, army engineers from the 94th Corps of Engineers of Fort Leonard Wood drew up plans of the monastery.

In June 2014, Mosul was taken over by the Islamic State of Iraq and the Levant. The militant group destroyed the monastery sometime between 27 August and 28 September 2014, along with a number of other cultural sites. The destruction of the monastery was not publicized by ISIL, and it was only confirmed by satellite imagery released in January 2016. The fact that its destruction went unreported for about 16 months led to fears that many other Christian sites in Iraq might have also been destroyed secretly.

Architecture
Before its destruction, it had 26 rooms built around a courtyard, including a chapel and a sanctuary.

References

External links

New York Times Article about restoration efforts of Dair Mar Elia
Photo slideshow on the New York Times website of restoration efforts at Dair Mar Elia
Article about restoration efforts from the Smithsonian Magazine

Christianity in Nineveh Governorate
Christian monasteries in Iraq
Chaldean Catholic monasteries
590s establishments
Monasteries of the Church of the East
1740s disestablishments in Asia
Destroyed monasteries
Buildings and structures destroyed by ISIL
Buildings and structures demolished in 2014
Churches destroyed by Muslims
Persecution of Christians in Iraq
Destroyed churches in Iraq
Sasanian church buildings